NGC 7085 is a spiral galaxy located about 365 million light-years away in the constellation of Pegasus. NGC 7085 was discovered by astronomer Albert Marth on August 3, 1864.

See also 
 List of NGC objects (7001–7840)

References

External links 

Spiral galaxies
Pegasus (constellation)
7085
66926
Astronomical objects discovered in 1864